Omed Abdulrahman Hassan known as Omed Khoshnaw (Kurdish: ئومێد خۆشناو, born 1 June 1977) is an Iraqi Kurdish politician of the Kurdistan Democratic Party (K.D.P). Khoshnaw is the current Erbil governor. He succeeded former governor Firsat Sofi, who died on 18th Nov 2020 due to COVID-19. During 2013 to 2021, Omed was member of parliament and head of the KDP Parliamentary block at Kurdistan Region Parliament.

Omed has bachelor's degree in Media and Communications, also he finished master's degree in Public Law.

References 

1977 births
People from Erbil
Living people
Kurdistan Democratic Party politicians
Members of the Kurdistan Region Parliament
Governors of Erbil Governorate